That Summer is the fourth novel by Scottish writer Andrew Greig. It was retitled The Clouds Above: A Novel of Love and War for the U.S. market.

Plot summary
It is June 1940. Working class Len Westbourne, an inexperienced fighter pilot, falls in love with Stella Gardam, a more worldly radar operator. Stella's friend Maddy is killed in a bombing raid and Len's squadron colleague, Polish pilot Tad, dies in a flying accident.

Told in alternate chapters from the perspectives of Len and Stella, That Summer is a love story told against the background of the Battle of Britain. Len is injured when his Hawker Hurricane crashes and goes off to recuperate with Stella in the countryside.

External links
Bio

2000 British novels
Novels by Andrew Greig
Scottish novels
Fiction set in 1940
Novels set during World War II
Faber and Faber books